Penicillium sajarovii is a species of fungus in the genus Penicillium.

References

Further reading 
 

sajarovii
Fungi described in 1981